Governor Owen may refer to:

John Owen (North Carolina politician) (1787–1841), 24th Governor of North Carolina
Roger Carmichael Robert Owen (1866–1941), Governor of Mongalla Province in South Sudan from 1908 to 1918

See also
Bill Owens (Colorado politician) (born 1950), 40th Governor of Colorado